Alum is a ghost town in Wilson County, in the U.S. state of Texas.

History
The first settlement was made at Alum before 1900. The community took its name from nearby Alum Creek.

References

Unincorporated communities in Wilson County, Texas
Unincorporated communities in Texas